The 2020 Connecticut House of Representatives election was held on Tuesday, November 3, 2020, to elect members to the Connecticut House of Representatives, one from each of the state's 151 General Assembly districts. The date of this the election corresponded with other elections in the state, including presidential, U.S. House, and the Connecticut State Senate. Democrats retained control of the House of Representatives, expanding their majority winning 97 seats to the Republicans 54, a net gain of 6.

Representatives elected will serve a two-year term, beginning in January 2021.

Predictions

Overview

Detailed results

District 1 
Democratic incumbent and House Majority Leader Matthew Ritter was re-elected to a 6th term after defeating Epic Party candidate Mark Stewart Greenstein and Socialist Resurgence Party Candidate Daniel Piper. Ritter was elected Speaker of the House on January 6, 2021. He has represented the 1st district since 2011.

District 2 
Democratic incumbent Raghib Allie-Brennan was re-elected to a 2nd term after defeating Republican Dan Carter. Allie-Brennan was also nominated by the Working Families Party, while Carter was nominated by the Independent Party. Allie-Brennan has represented the 2nd district since 2019.

District 3 
Democratic incumbent Minnie Gonzalez was re-elected to a 13th term after running unopposed. Gonzalez has represented the 3rd district since 1997.

District 4 
Democratic incumbent Julio Concepcion was re-elected to a 3rd term after defeating Republican candidate Barry D'Andrea. Concepcion has represented the 4th district since 2018.

District 5 
Democratic incumbent Brandon McGee was re-elected to a 5th term after defeating Republican candidate Charles Jackson. Jackson was also nominated by the Independent Party. McGee has represented the 5th district since 2013.

District 6 
Democratic incumbent Edwin Vargas Jr. was re-elected to a 5th term after running unopposed. Vargas was also nominated by the Working Families Party. He has represented the 6th district since 2013.

District 7 
Democratic incumbent Joshua M. Hall was re-elected to a 3rd term after running unopposed. Hall has represented the 7th district since 2017.

District 8 
Republican incumbent Tim Ackert was re-elected to a 6th term after defeating Democratic candidate Brenda Falusi. Ackert has represented the 7th district since 2011.

District 9 
Democratic incumbent Jason Rojas was re-elected to a 7th term after defeating Republican candidate Cathy Hopperstad. Hopperstad was also nominated by the Independent Party. Rojas was elected House Majority Leader on January 6, 2021. He has represented the 9th district since 2009.

District 10 
Democratic incumbent Henry Grenga was re-elected to a 9th term after running unopposed. He has represented the 10th district since 2006.

District 11 
Democratic incumbent Jeff Currey was re-elected to a 4th term after defeating Republican candidate Matt Harper. Harper was also nominated by the Independent Party. Currey has represented the 11th district since 2015.

District 12 
Democratic incumbent Geoff Luxenberg was re-elected to a 4th term after defeating Republican candidate Jeff Sullivan. Luxenberg was also nominated by the Working Families Party. He has represented the 12th district from 2011 to 2015, and then from 2019 to present.

District 13 
Democratic incumbent Jason Doucette was re-elected to a 2nd term after defeating Republican candidate Brain Marois. Doucette was also nominated by the Working Families Party, while Marois was nominated by the Independent Party. Doucette has represented the 13th district since 2019.

District 14 
Republican incumbent Tom Delnicki was re-elected to a 3rd term after defeating Democratic candidate Genevieve Coursey. Delnicki was also nominated by the Independent Party, while Coursey was nominated by the Working Families Party. Delnicki has represented the 14th district since 2017.

District 15 
Democratic incumbent Bobby Gibson was re-elected to a 3rd term after defeating candidate Danielle Wong. Gibson had previously defeated Wong in the Democratic Primary. Gibson was also nominated by the Working Families Party. He has represented the 15th district since 2018.

District 16 
Democratic incumbent John Hampton was re-elected to a 5th term after running unopposed. He has represented the 16th district since 2013.

District 17 
Democratic candidate Eleni Kavros DeGraw was elected after defeating 1st term Republican incumbent Leslee Hill. DeGraw was also nominated by the Working Families Party, while Hill was nominated by the Independent Party. Hill had represented the 17th district since 2019.

District 18 
Democratic incumbent Jillian Gilchrest was re-elected to a 2nd term after defeating Republican candidate Rick Bush. Gilchrest has represented the 18th district since 2019.

District 19 
Democratic incumbent Tammy Exum was re-elected to a 2nd term after running unopposed. Exum has represented the 19th district since 2020

District 20 
Democratic candidate Kate Farrar was elected unopposed. Farrar was also nominated by the Working Families Party. This seat was previously held by Democrat Joe Verrengia, who had represented the 20th district since 2011. Verrengia decided not to run for re-election.

District 21 
Democratic incumbent Mike Demicco was re-elected to a 5th term after defeating Republican candidate John W. Brockelman and Independent Party candidate David Paul Kramer. Demicco was also nominated by the Working Families Party. He has represented the 21st district since 2013.

District 22 
Republican incumbent William Petit Jr. was re-elected to a 3rd term after running unopposed. Petit was also nominated by the Independent Party. He has represented the 22nd district since 2017.

District 23 
Republican incumbent Devin Carney was re-elected to a 4th term after defeating Democratic candidate David A. Rubino. Carney was nominated by the Independent Party, while Rubino was nominated by the Working Families Party. Carney has represented the 23rd district since 2015.

District 24 
Democratic candidate Manny Sanchez was elected after defeating Republican candidate Alden Russell. Sanchez was also nominated by the Working Families Party, while Russell was nominated by the Independent Party. This seat was previously held by Democrat Rick Lopes, who had represented District 24 since 2011. Lopes decided not to run for re-election to run successfully for State Senate.

District 25 
Democratic incumbent Bobby Sanchez was re-elected to a 6th term after defeating Republican candidate Jerrell Hargraves. Sanchez was also nominated by the Working Families Party. He has represented the 25th district since 2011.

District 26 
Democratic incumbent Peter Tercyak was re-elected to a 10th term after defeating Republican candidate Piotr Ceglarz and Libertarian candidate Johnathan Milon Johnson. Tercyak has represented the 26th district since 2003.

District 27 
Democratic incumbent Gary Turco was re-elected to a 2nd term after defeating Republican candidate Michael Camillo. Turco was also nominated by the Working Families Party, while Camillo was nominated by the Independent Party. Turco has represented the 27th district since 2019.

District 28 
Democratic candidate Amy Morrin Bello was elected after defeating Republican candidate Patrick Pentalow and Independent Party candidate Henry Thayer.

District 29 
Democratic incumbent Kerry Szeps Wood was re-elected to a 2nd term after defeating Republican candidate Henry Vasel. Vasel was also nominated by the Independent Party. Wood has represented the 29th district since 2019.

District 30 
Republican candidate Donna Veach was elected after defeating Democratic candidate JoAnn Angelico-Stetson. Angelico-Stetson was also nominated by the Working Families Party. The 30th district was previously held by former Democratic Speaker of the House Joe Aresimowicz, who had represented the 30th district since 2005. Aresimowicz decided not to run for re-election.

District 31 
Democratic incumbent Jill Barry was re-elected to a 2nd term after defeating Republican candidate Chip Beckett. Beckett was also nominated by the Independent Party. Barry has represented the 31st district since 2019.

District 32 
Republican Christie Carpino was re-elected to a 6th term after running unopposed. Carpino was also nominated by the Independent Party. She has represented the 32nd district since 2011.

District 33 
Democratic candidate Brandon Chafee was elected after defeating Republican Linda Szynkowicz. Chafee was also nominated by the Working Families Party, while Szynkowicz was nominated by the Independent party. This seat was previously held by Joseph Cerra, who had represented the 33rd district since 1993. Cerra decided not to run for re-election.

District 34 
Republican incumbent Irene Haines was re-elected to a 2nd term after defeating Democratic candidate Judd Melon and Indepedendent Party candidate Lance Lusignan. Melon was also nominated by the Working Families Party. Haines has represented the 34th district since 2019.

District 35 
Democratic candidate Christine Goupil was elected after defeating Republican candidate John Hall III. Goupil was also nominated by the Independent Party and the Working Families Party. This seat was previously held by Republican Jesse MacLachlan, who had represented the 35th district since 2015. MacLahlan decided not to run for re-election.

District 36 
Democratic incumbent Christine Palm was re-elected to a 2nd term after defeating Republican candidate Robert Siegrist. Palm was also nominated by the Working Families Party, while Siegrist was nominated by the Independent Party. Palm has represented the 36th district since 2019.

District 37 
Republican incumbent Holly Cheeseman was re-elected to a 3rd term after defeating Democratic candidate Cate Steel. Cheeseman was also nominated by the Independent Party, while Steel was nominated by the Working Families Party. Cheeseman has represented the 37th district since 2017.

District 38 
Republican incumbent Kathleen McCarty was re-elected to 4th term after defeating Democratic candidate Baird Welch-Collins. McCarty was also nominated by the Independent Party. She has represented the 38th district since 2015.

District 39 
Democratic incumbent Anthony Nolan was re-elected to a 2nd term after defeating Republican candidate Kat Goulart and Green Party candidate Erycka Ortiz. Nolan was also nominated by the Working Families Party. Nolan has represented the 39th district since 2021.

District 40 
Democratic incumbent Christine Conley was re-elected to a 3rd term after defeating Republican candidate Lauren Gauthier. Conley was also nominated by the Working Families Party, while Gauthier was nominated by the Independent Party. Conley has represented the 40th district since 2017.

District 41 
Democratic incumbent Joe de la Cruz was re-elected to a 3rd term after running unopposed. De la Cruz was also nominated by the Working Families Party. He has represented the 41st district since 2017.

District 42 
Republican incumbent Mike France was re-elected to a 4th term after defeating Democratic candidate Matt Green and petitioning candidate Robert Lawrence. France was also nominated by the Independent Party, while Green was nominated by the Working Families Party. France has represented the 42nd district since 2015.

District 43 
Republican Greg Howard was elected after defeating 1st term incumbent Democrat Kate Rotella. Howard was also nominated by the Independent Party. Rotella had represented the 43rd district since 2019.

District 44 
Republican incumbent Anne Dauphinais was re-elected to a 3rd term after defeating Democratic candidate Christine Rosati Randall. Dauphinais was also nominated by the Independent Party, while Rosati was nominated by the Working Families Party. Dauphinais has represented the 44th district since 2017.

District 45 
Republican incumbent Brian Lanoue was re-elected to a 2nd term after defeating Democratic candidate Mark DePonte and Independent Party candidate Daniel Reale. Lanoue has represented the 45th district since 2019.

District 46 
Democratic incumbent Emmett Riley was re-elected to a 5th term after defeating Republican candidate Robert Bell. Riley was also nominated by the Working Families Party, while Bell was nominated Independent Party. Riley has represented the 46th district since 2013.

District 47 
Republican incumbent Doug Dubitsky was re-elected to a 4th term after defeating Democratic candidate Kate Donnelly. Dubitsky was also nominated by the Independent Party, while Donnelly was nominated by the Working Families Party. Dubitsky has represented the 47th district since 2015.

District 48 
Democratic incumbent Brian Smith was re-elected to a 2nd term after defeating Republican candidate Julie Shilosky. Smith was also nominated by the Working Families Party, while Shilosky was nominated by the Independent Party. Smith has represented the 48th district since 2020.

District 49 
Democratic incumbent Susan Johnson was re-elected to a 9th term after running unopposed. Johnson was also nominated by the Working Families Party. John has represented the 49th district since 2009.

District 50 
Democratic incumbent Pat Boyd was re-elected to a 3rd term after running unopposed. Boyd has represented the 50th district since 2017.

District 51 
Republican incumbent Rick Hayes was re-elected to a 2nd term after defeating Democratic candidate Larry Groh Jr. Hayes was also nominated by the Independent Party. He has represented the 51st district since 2019.

District 52 
Republican incumbent Kurt Vail was re-elected to a 4th term after defeating Democratic candidate Greg Post. Vail was also nominated by the Independent Party, while Post was nominated by the Working Families Party. Vail has represented the 52nd district since 2015.

District 53 
Republican candidate Tammy Nuccio was elected after defeating 1st term Democratic incumbent Pat Wilson Pheanious. Nuccio was also nominated by the Independent Party, while Pheanious was nominated by the Working Families Party. Pheanious had represented the 53rd district since 2019.

District 54 
Democratic incumbent Gregory Haddad was re-elected to a 6th term after running unopposed. Haddad was also nominated by the Working Families Party. He has represented the 54th district since 2011.

District 55 
Republican incumbent Robin Green was re-elected to a third term after defeating Democratic candidate John Collins and petitioning candidate Salvatore V. Sena Jr. Green has represented the 55th district since 2017.

District 56 
Democratic incumbent Michael Winkler was re-elected to a third term after defeating Republican candidate Laura B. Bush. Winkler was also nominated by the Working Families Party, while Bush was nominated by the Independent Party. Winkler has represented the 56th district since 2017.

District 57 
Democratic candidate Jaime Foster was elected after defeating Republican candidate David Stevens. Foster was also nominated by the Working Families Party and the Independent Party. The seat was previously held by Republican Christoper Davis, who had represented the 57th district since 2011.

District 58 
Democratic incumbent Tom Arnone was re-elected to a 2nd term after defeating Republican candidate Mary Ann Turner. Arnone was also nominated by the Working Families Party. Arnone has represented the 58th district since 2019.

District 59 
Republican incumbent Carol Hall was re-elected to a 3rd term after defeating Democratic candidate Gerald Calnen. Hall was also nominated by the Independent Party. She has represented the 59th district since 2017.

District 60 
Democratic incumbent Jane Garibay was re-elected to a 2nd term after defeating Republican candidate Scott Storms. Storms was also nominated by the Independent Party. She has represented the 60th district since 2019.

District 61 
Republican incumbent Tami Zawistowski was re-elected to a 5th term after defeating Democratic candidate Jack Henrie. Zawistowski was also nominated by the Independent Party. Zawistowski has represented the 61st term since 2014.

District 62 
Republican candidate Mark Anderson was elected after defeating Democratic candidate Audrey Lampert. Anderson was also nominated by the Independent Party. This seat was previously held by Republican William Simanski since 2011.

District 63 
Republican incumbent Jay Case was re-elected to a 5th term after defeating Democratic candidate Noel Rodriquez. Rodriquez was also nominated by the Independent Party. Case has represented the 63rd district since 2013.

District 64 
Democratic incumbent Maria Horn was re-elected to a 2nd term after defeating Republican candidate Brian Ohler. Horn was also nominated by the Working Families Party, while Ohler was nominated by the Independent Party. Horn has represented the 64th district since 2019.

District 65 
Democratic incumbent Michelle Cook was re-elected to a 7th term after defeating Republican candidate Christopher Beyus and Green Party candidate Don Vaniah Alexander. Cook was also nominated by the Working Families Party, while Beyus was nominated by the Independent Party. Cook has represented the 65th district since 2009.

District 66 
Republican incumbent David Wilson was re-elected to a 3rd term after defeating Democratic candidate Matthew Dyer. Wilson was also nominated by the Independent Party, while Dyer was nominated by the Working Families Party. Wilson has represented the 66th district since 2017.

District 67 
Republican incumbent Bill Buckbee was re-elected to a 3rd term after defeating Democratic candidate Hilary Ram. Buckbee was also nominated by the Independent Party, while Ram was nominated by the Working Families Party. Buckbee has represented the 67th district since 2017.

District 68 
Republican incumbent Joe Polletta was re-elected to a 3rd term after defeating Democratic candidate Sean Butterly. Polletta was also nominated by the Independent Party. Polletta has represented the 68th district since 2017.

District 69 
Republican candidate Cindy Harrison was elected after defeating Democratic candidate Michele Zommer. This seat was previously held by Republican Arthur O'Neill since 1989.

District 70 
Republican incumbent Rosa Rebimbas was re-elected to a 7th term after defeating Democratic candidate Stephen Samela. Rebimbas has represented the 70th district since 2009.

District 71 
Republican incumbent Anthony D'Amelio was re-elected to a 14th term after running unopposed. D'Amelio has represented the 71st district since 1996.

District 72 
Democratic incumbent Larry Butler was re-elected to an 8th term after defeating Republican candidate Vernon Matthews. Butler was also nominated by the Independent Party. He has represented the 72nd district since 2007.

District 73 
Democratic incumbent Ronald Napoli Jr. was re-elected to a 2nd term after running unopposed. Napoli was also nominated by the Independent Party and the Working Families Party. He has represented the 73rd district since 2019.

District 74 
Democratic candidate Michael DiGiovancarlo was elected after defeating 2nd term Republican incumbent Stephanie Cummings. DiGiovancarlo was also nominated by the Working Families Party, while Cummings was nominated by the Independent Party. Cummings had represented the 74th district since 2017.

District 75 
Democratic incumbent Geraldo Reyes Jr. was re-elected to a 4th term after running unopposed. Reyes has represented the 75th district since 2016.

District 76 
Republican incumbent John Piscopo was re-elected to a 17th term after defeating Democratic candidate Paul Honig. Piscopo was also nominated by the Independent Party. He has represented the 76th district since 1989.

District 77 
Republican incumbent Cara Pavalock-D'Amato was re-elected to a 4th term after defeating Democratic candidate Andrew Rasmussen-Taylor. Pavalock-D'Amato was also nominated by the Independent Party. She has represented the 77th district since 2015.

District 78 
Republican incumbent Whit Betts was re-elected to a 6th term after defeating Independent Party candidate Aileen Abrams. Betts has represented the 78th district since 2011.

District 79 
Democratic incumbent Christopher Ziogas was re-elected to a 3rd term after defeating Republican candidate David Rackliffe. Rackliffe was also nominated by the Independent Party. Ziogas has represented the 79th district since 2017.

District 80 
Republican incumbent Gale Mastrofrancesco was re-elected to a 2nd term after defeating Democratic candidate John Corky Mazurek. Mazurek was also nominated by the Independent Party. Mastrofrancesco has represented the 80th district since 2019.

District 81 
Republican incumbent John Fusco was re-elected to a 3rd term after defeating Democratic candidate Dagmara Scalise. Fusco was also nominated by the Independent Party. He has represented the 81st district since 2017.

District 82 
Democratic candidate Michael Quinn was elected after defeating Republican candidate Mike Skelps and Independent Party candidate Ernestine Holloway. Quinn was also nominated by the Working Families Party. This seat was previously held by Democrat Emil Altobello since 1995.

District 83 
Democratic incumbent Catherine Abercrombie was re-elected to a 9th term after defeating Republican candidate Lou Arata. Arata was also nominated by the Independent Party. Abercrombie has represented the 83rd district since 2005.

District 84 
Democratic incumbent Hilda Santiago was re-elected to a 5th term after defeating Republican candidate Richard Cordero. Santiago was also nominated by the Working Families Party. She has represented the 84th district since 2013.

District 85 
Democratic incumbent Mary Mushinsky was re-elected to a 21st term after defeating Republican candidate Weston Ulbrich. Mushinsky was also nominated by the Working Families Party, while Ulbrich was nominated by the Independent Party. Mushinsky has represented the 85th district since 1981.

District 86 
Republican incumbent Vincent Candelora was re-elected to a 8th term after defeating Democratic candidate Vincent Mase. Candelora was also nominated by the Independent Party. He became House Minority Leader on January 6, 2021. He has represented the 86th district since 2007.

District 87 
Republican incumbent Dave Yaccarino was re-elected to a 6th term after defeating Democratic candidate Kathy Grant. Yaccarino was also nominated by the Independent Party, while Grant was nominated by the Working Families Party.

District 88 
Democratic incumbent Josh Elliott was re-elected to a 3rd term after defeating Republican candidate Kathleen Hoyt. Elliott was also nominated by the Working Families Party. He has represented the 88th district since 2017.

District 89 
Republican incumbent Lezlye Zupkus was re-elected to a 5th term after defeating Democratic candidate E.J. Maher. Zupkus was also nominated by the Independent Party. She has represented the 89th district since 2013.

District 90 
Republican incumbent Craig C. Fishbein was re-elected to a 4th term after defeating Democratic candidate Jim Jinks. Fishbein was also nominated by the Independent Party, while Jinks was nominated by the Working Families Party. Fishbein has represented the 90th district since 2016.

District 91 
Democratic incumbent Michael D'Agostino was re-elected to a 5th term after defeating petitioning candidate Weruche George. D'Agostino has represented the 91st district since 2013.

District 92 
Democratic incumbent Patricia Dillon was re-elected to a 19th term after running unopposed. Dillon was also nominated by the Working Families Party. She has represented the 82nd district since 1985.

District 93 
Democratic incumbent Toni Walker was re-elected to an 11th term after running unopposed. Walker has represented the 93rd district since 2001.

District 94 
Democratic incumbent Robyn Porter was re-elected to a 5th term after running unopposed. Porter has represented the 94th district since 2014.

District 95 
Democratic incumbent Juan Candelaria was re-elected to a 10th term after running unopposed. Candelaria has represented the 95th district since 2003.

District 96 
Democratic incumbent Roland Lemar was re-elected to a 6th term after defeating Republican candidate Eric Mastroianni. Lemar was also nominated by the Working Families Party, while Mastroianni was nominated by the Independent Party. Lemar has represented the 96th district since 2011.

District 97 
Democratic incumbent Alphonese Paolillo was re-elected to a 3rd term after defeating Republican candidate Erin Reilly. Reilly was also nominated by the Independent Party. Paolillo has represented the 97th district since 2017.

District 98 
Democratic incumbent Sean Scanlon was re-elected to a 4th term after running unopposed. Scanlon was also nominated by the Working Families Party. He has represented the 98th district since 2015.

District 99 
Republican incumbent Joe Zullo was re-elected to a 2nd term after defeating Democratic candidate Dave Yaccarino. Zullo was also nominated by the Independent Party, while Yaccarino was nominated by the Working Families Party. Zullo has represented the 99th district since 2019.

District 100 
Democratic incumbent Quentin Phipps was re-elected to a 2nd term after defeating Republican candidate Tony Gennaro. Phipps was also nominated by the Working Families Party. He has represented the 100th district since 2019.

District 101 
Democratic candidate John-Michael Parker was elected after defeating 5th term Republican incumbent Noreen Kokoruda. Parker was also nominated by the Independent Party and the Working Families Party. Kokoruda had represented the 101st district since 2011.

District 102 

Democratic incumbent Robin Comey was re-elected to a 2nd term after defeating Republican candidate Marc Riccio. Comey was also nominated by the Working Families Party, while Riccio was nominated by the Independent Party. Comey has represented the 102nd district since 2019.

District 103 

Democratic incumbent Liz Linehan was re-elected to a 3rd term after defeating Republican candidate Pam Salamone. Salamone was also nominated by the Independent Party. Linehan has represented the 103rd district since 2017.

District 104 

Democratic incumbent Kara Rochelle was re-elected to 2nd term after defeating Republican candidate Myra Rivers. Rochelle was also nominated by the Independent Party and the Working Families Party. Rochelle has represented the 104th district since 2019.

District 105 

Republican incumbent Nicole Klarides-Ditria was re-elected to a 3rd term after defeating Democratic candidate Christopher Bowen. Klarides-Ditria has represented the 105th district since 2017.

District 106 

Republican incumbent Mitch Bolinsky was re-elected to a 5th term after defeating Democratic candidate Rebekah Harriman-Stites. Harriman-Stites was also nominated by the Working Families Party. Bolinsky has represented the 106th district since 2013.

District 107 

Republican incumbent Stephen Harding was re-elected to a 4th term after defeating Democratic candidate Kerri Colombo. Harding was also nominated by the Independent Party, while Colombo was nominated by the Working Families Party. Harding has represented the 107th district since 2015.

District 108 

Republican candidate Patrick Callahan was elected after defeating Democratic candidate Danette Onofrio. This seat was previously held by Republican Richard Smith since 2011.

District 109 

Democratic incumbent David Arconti was re-elected to a 5th term after defeating Republican candidate Michael Henry. Arconti was also nominated by the Working Families Party, while Henry was nominated by the Independent Party. Arconti has represented the 109th district since 2013.

District 110 

Democratic incumbent and House Speaker pro tempore Bob Godfrey was re-elected to a 17th term after defeating Republican candidate Erin Domenech. Godfrey was also nominated by the Working Families Party, while Domenech was nominated by the Independent Party. Godfrey has represented the 110th district since 1989 and has served as Speaker pro tempore since 2017.

District 111 

Democratic candidate Aimee Berger-Girvalo was elected after defeating Republican candidate Bob Hebert. Hebert was also nominated by the Independent Party. This seat was previously held by Republican John H. Frey since 1999.

District 112 

Republican incumbent J.P. Sredsinski was re-elected to a 4th term after running unopposed. Sredsinski was also nominated by the Independent Party. He has represented the 112th district since 2015.

District 113 

Republican incumbent Jason Perillo was re-elected to a 8th term after defeating Democratic candidate Elaine Matto. Perillo has represented the 113th district since 2007.

District 114 

Democratic candidate Mary Welander was elected after defeating Republican candidate Dan DeBarba. Welander was also nominated by the Working Families Party, while DeBarba was nominated by the Independent Party. This seat was previously held by Republican Themis Klarides since 1999. Klarides had served as House Minority Leader from 2015 to 2021.

District 115 

Democratic incumbent Dorinda Borer was re-elected to a 3rd term after running unopposed. Borer was also nominated by the Working Families Party. Borer has represented the 115th district since 2017.

District 116 

Democratic incumbent Michael DiMassa was re-elected to a 3rd term after running unopposed. DiMassa was also nominated by the Working Families Party. He has represented the 116th district since 2017.

District 117 

Republican incumbent Charles Ferraro was re-elected to a 4th term after defeating Democratic candidate Tony Sutton. Sutton was also nominated by the Independent Party and the Working Families Party. Ferraro has represented the 117th district since 2015.

District 118 

Democratic candidate Frank Smith was elected after defeating Republican candidate Erik Smith. Frank Smith was also nominated by the Working Families Party, while Erik Smith was nominated by the Independent Party. This seat was previously held by Democrat Kim Rose since 2011.

District 119 

Republican incumbent Kathy Kennedy was re-elected to a 2nd term after defeating Democratic candidate Bryan Anderson. Anderson was also nominated by the Independent Party and the Working Families Party.

District 120 

Democratic incumbent Philip Young was re-elected to a 3rd term after defeating Republican candidate Jim Feehan. Feehan was also nominated by the Independent Party. Young has represented the 120th district since 2018.

District 121 

Democratic incumbent Joe Gresko was re-elected to a 4th term after defeating Republican candidate Edward Scinto. Gresko has represented the 121st district since 2016.

District 122 

Republican incumbent Ben McGorty was re-elected to a 5th term after defeating Democratic candidate Jose Goncalves. McGorty has represented the 122nd district since 2014.

District 123 

Republican incumbent David Rutigliano was re-elected to a 5th term after defeating Democratic candidate Sujata Gadkar-Wilcox. Rutigliano was also nominated by the Independent Party, while Gadkar-Wilcox was nominated by the Working Families Party. Rutigliano has represented the 123rd district since 2013.

District 124 

Democratic incumbent Andre Baker was re-elected to a 4th term after defeating Republican candidate Jasmin Sanchez and Independent Party candidate Wilfredo Martinez. Baker has represented the 124th district since 2015.

District 125 

Republican incumbent Tom O'Dea was re-elected to a 5th term after running unopposed. O'Dea has represented the 125th district since 2015.

District 126 

Democratic incumbent Charlie Stallworth was re-elected to a 6th term after defeating Republican candidate Lee Grisby. Stallworth has represented the 126th district since 2011.

District 127 

Democratic incumbent John Hennessy was re-elected to a 9th term after defeating Republican candidate Peter Perillo and petitioning candidate Robert Keeley. Hennessy has represented the 127th district since 2005.

District 128 

Democratic incumbent Christopher Rosario was re-elected to a 4th term after defeating Republican candidate Ethan Book and petitioning candidate Wanda Simmons. Book was also nominated by the Independent Party. Rosario has represented the 128th district since 2015.

District 129 

Democratic incumbent Steven Stafstrom was re-elected to a 4th term after defeating Republican candidate Helene Kouassi and petitioning candidate Robert Halstead. Stafstrom has represented the 129th district since 2015.

District 130 

Democratic incumbent Antonio Felipe was re-elected to a 2nd term after defeating Republican candidate Terrence Sullivan. Felipe has represented the 130th district since 2019.

District 131 

Republican incumbent David Labriola was re-elected to a 10th term after running unopposed. Labriola has represented the 131st district since 2003.

District 132 

Democratic candidate Jennifer Leeper was elected after defeating Republican incumbent Brian Farnen. Leeper was also nominated by the Working Families Party, while Farnen was nominated by the Independent Party. Farnen had represented the 132nd district since 2020.

District 133 

Democratic incumbent Cristin McCarthy Vahey was re-elected to a 4th term after defeating Republican candidate Joanne Romano-Csonka. Vahey was also nominated by the Working Families Party, while Romano-Csonka was nominated by the Independent Party. Vahey has represented the 133rd district since 2015.

District 134 

Republican incumbent Laura Devlin was re-elected to a 4th term after defeating Democratic candidate Carla Volpe. Volpe was also nominated by the Independent Party and the Working Families Party. Devlin has represented the 134th district since 2015.

District 135 

Democratic incumbent Anne Meiman Hughes was re-elected to a 2nd term after defeating Republican candidate John Shaban. Shaban was also nominated by the Independent Party. Hughes has represented the 135th district since 2019.

District 136 

Democratic incumbent Jonathan Steinberg was re-elected to a 6th term after defeating Republican candidate Chip Stephens. Steinberg has represented the 136th district since 2011.

District 137 

Democratic incumbent Chris Perone was re-elected to a 9th term after defeating Republican candidate Ellen Wink. Wink was also nominated by the Independent Party. Perone has represented the 137th district since 2005.

District 138 

Democratic incumbent Kenneth Gucker was re-elected to a 2nd term after defeating Republican candidate Emile Buzaid. Gucker was also nominated by the Working Families Party, while Buzaid was nominated by the Independent Party. Gucker has represented the 138th district since 2019.

District 139 
Democratic incumbent Kevin Ryan was re-elected to a 15th term after defeating Republican candidate Caleb Espinosa. Ryan was also nominated by the Working Families Party, while Espinosa was nominated by the Independent Party. Ryan has represented the 139th district since 1993.

District 140 

Democratic incumbent Travis Simms was re-elected to a 2nd term after defeating Republican candidate John Flynn. Simms has represented the 140th district since 2019.

District 141 

Republican incumbent Terrie Wood was re-elected to a 7th term after running unopposed. Wood was also nominated by the Independent Party. She has represented the 141st district since 2009.

District 142 
Democratic incumbent Lucy Dathan was re-elected to a 2nd term after defeating Republican candidate Fred Wilms. Dathan was also nominated by the Working Families Party, while Wilms was nominated by the Independent Party. Dathan has represented the 142nd district since 2019.

District 143 

Democratic candidate Stephanie Thomas was elected after defeating Republican candidate Patricia Zucaro. Thomas was also nominated by the Working Families Party, while Zucaro was nominated by the Independent Party. This seat was previously held by Republican Gail Lavielle since 2011.

District 144 

Democratic incumbent Caroline Simmons was re-elected to a 4th term after running unopposed. Simmons has represented the 144th district since 2015.

District 145 

Democratic incumbent Patricia Billie Miller was re-elected to a 7th term after defeating Republican candidate J.D. Ospina. Miller has represented the 145th district since 2009.

District 146 

Democratic incumbent David Michel was re-elected to a 2nd term after defeating Republican candidate George Hallenbeck. Michel has represented the 146th district since 2019.

District 147 

Democratic incumbent Matt Blumenthal was re-elected to a 2nd term after defeating Republican candidate Dan Maymin. Blumenthal has represented the 147th district since 2019.

District 148 

Democratic incumbent Daniel Fox was re-elected to a 6th term after defeating Republican candidate Wilm Donath. Fox has represented the 148th district since 2011.

District 149 

Republican candidate Kimberly Fiorello was elected after defeating Democratic candidate Kathleen Stowe. Fiorello was also nominated by the Independent Party. This seat was previously held by Republican Livvy Floren since 2001.

District 150 

Democratic incumbent Steve Meskers was re-elected to a 2nd term after defeating Republican candidate Joe Kelly. Kelly was also nominated by the Independent Party. Meskers has represented the 150th district since 2019.

District 151 
Republican incumbent Harry Arora was re-elected to a 2nd term after defeating Democratic candidate Hector Arzeno. Arora has represented the 151st district since 2020.

See also
 2020 Connecticut elections
 2020 Connecticut Senate election

References

External links 
 Statement of vote

House 2020
House of Representatives
Connecticut House